An election to Lancashire County Council took place on 2 May 2013 as part of the United Kingdom local elections, 2013. 84 councillors were elected from single-member electoral divisions by first-past-the-post for a four-year term of office. Electoral divisions were the same as those at the previous election in 2009. Elections were held in all electoral divisions across the present ceremonial county, excepting Blackpool and Blackburn with Darwen which are unitary authorities in a similar way to Greater Manchester and most of Merseyside. The election saw the Conservative Party lose overall control of the council, instead overtaken in number of seats by the Labour Party, without any absolute majority.

All locally registered electors (British, Irish, Commonwealth and European Union citizens) who were aged 18 or over on Thursday 2 May 2013 were entitled to vote in the local elections. Those who were temporarily away from their ordinary address (for example, away working, on holiday, in student accommodation or in hospital) were also entitled to vote in the local elections, although those who had moved abroad and registered as overseas electors cannot vote in the local elections. It is possible to register to vote at more than one address (such as a university student who had a term-time address and lives at home during holidays) at the discretion of the local Electoral Register Office, but it remains an offence to vote more than once in the same local government election.

Summary

Results

Burnley

Chorley

Fylde

Hyndburn

Lancaster

Pendle

Preston

Ribble Valley

Rossendale

South Ribble

West Lancashire

Wyre

References

2013 English local elections
2013